Filipeștii de Pădure is a commune in Prahova County, Muntenia, Romania. It is composed of four villages: Dițești, Filipeștii de Pădure, Minieri and Siliștea Dealului.

Natives
 Constantin Croitoru (born 1952), Lieutenant General, Chief of Staff of the Romanian Air Force (2007–2009)

References

Communes in Prahova County
Localities in Muntenia